Cik Puan Besar Hajjah Kalsom binti Abdullah, formerly known as Sultanah Kalsom (née Anita Abdullah; born 12 September 1951 in Taftan, Baluchistan, Dominion of Pakistan) is the former Sultanah consort of Pahang as the 2nd wife and widow of Sultan Haji Ahmad Shah. She is of Persian and Pakistani descent. Prior to her marriage, she was an air stewardess for a prominent airline.

Cik Puan Besar Hajjah Kalsom married Sultan Ahmad Shah of Pahang on 14 March 1991. She was titled Her Highness Cik Puan Kalsom binti Abdullah on the day of her marriage and later became the Sultanah of Pahang, with the style of Her Royal Highness on 30 September 1992.

She and the Sultan have a son together: His Highness Tengku Fahad Mu'adzam Shah Ibni Sultan Haji Ahmad Shah Al-Musta’in Billah, the Tengku Arif Temenggong of Pahang.

After her husband's death in May 2019, her stepson, Al-Sultan Abdullah bestowed her the title of Cik Puan Besar of Pahang or equivalent to a Queen Dowager. She is styled Her Highness. The title Cik Puan Besar of Pahang is for a commoner who became a widow of the late Sultan.

Contributions
Cik Puan Besar Hajjah Kalsom has been active with social causes and is a patron of numerous organisations, lending her presence to inspire those engaged in managing these organisations.

Yayasan Sri Kencana Kalsom
The Yayasan Sri Kencana Kalsom, named after her, provides shelter for single parents as well as women who have been victims of domestic abuse. The Yayasan helps these women rebuild their lives finding them jobs that enable them to be independent and lead their lives with dignity.

OrphanCARE
She is also Patron of OrphanCARE Foundation, a non-profit organisation that aims in getting orphans adopted. OrphanCARE also set up Malaysia's first baby hatch for mothers to anonymously leave their unwanted newborns to be put up for adoption. She has given her full support to the organisation which has the Ministry of Women, Family and Community Development as its smart partner.

Soroptimist Club of Kuantan
As Patron of the Soroptimist Club of Kuantan, a gathering of professional women who pool their talents to assist the needy, Cik Puan Besar Hajjah Kalsom works closely to guide the movement with her strong views on empowerment. Her concern for women stems from her personal philosophy that dreams must be pursued to the fullest and that women must be given every opportunity to realise their talents.

The Sorority
Cik Puan Besar Hajjah Kalsom is also an Honorary Member of The Sorority, an exclusive members-only club for inspiring professional women based in London, is considered an iconic inspirational woman who represents the modern, professional woman who is shaping the future with individual style and expression.

Kiwanis Club of Kuantan 
Cik Puan Besar Hajjah Kalsom has been the patron of the Kiwanis Club of Kuantan since 2004.

Honours
For the exceptional work that is inspiring societal advancement the Limkokwing University of Creative Technology awarded Sultanah Kalsom the Honorary Doctorate of Social Development.

Honours of Pahang 
  : 
  Member 1st class of the Family Order of the Crown of Indra of Pahang (DK I)

References 

1951 births
Living people
Royal House of Pahang
Malaysian people of Indian descent
Malaysian people of Malay descent
Malaysian Muslims
Pahang royal consorts